Zgornje Vodale ( or ) is a small settlement in the hills east of Tržišče in the Municipality of Sevnica in central Slovenia. The area is part of the traditional region of Lower Carniola and is included in the Lower Sava Statistical Region.

References

External links
Zgornje Vodale at Geopedia

Populated places in the Municipality of Sevnica